Rio Grande Dam is a dam in Hinsdale County, Colorado impounding the Rio Grande.

Purpose 
The primary purpose of the Rio Grande Dam is to provide irrigation water to the San Luis Valley. The water stored in the reservoir behind the dam is used to irrigate over 60,000 acres of farmland in the valley. The dam also provides water for municipal and industrial use in the area.

Recreation 
The Rio Grande Dam and reservoir are also popular recreational destinations. The reservoir provides opportunities for fishing, boating, and swimming. The surrounding area is home to several campgrounds, hiking trails, and scenic drives.

See also
List of Rio Grande dams and diversions
List of largest reservoirs of Colorado

References

Dams in Colorado
Dams on the Rio Grande
United States local public utility dams
Dams completed in 1914
1914 establishments in Colorado